Abu Abdallah IV or Abu Abdallah Mohammed IV (ruled 1468–1504) was a Sultan of the Kingdom of Tlemcen in Algeria. He was a son of Abu Abdallah III and was succeeded by his son Abu Abdallah V. During his reign he defeated Portugal in the battle of Mers El Kebir (1501) and the Oran fatwa were made at the same year of his reigns end.

References

1504 deaths
15th-century Berber people
15th-century monarchs in Africa
Berber rulers
Year of birth missing
Zayyanid dynasty